Platinum Studios, Inc. is a media company based in the United States. It controls a library of thousands of comic-book characters, which it seeks to adapt, produce, and license for all forms of media. The company has released films and/or television programming with Universal Studios, Paramount Pictures, DreamWorks, MGM, Showtime, and Lions Gate. Platinum has developed film or television with others, including Disney's 20th Century Studios, WarnerMedia's New Line Cinema and Sony Pictures Entertainment.

History
Platinum Studios was co-founded in January 1997 by Scott Mitchell Rosenberg and European rights agent Ervin Rustemagić. As the former head of Malibu Comics, Rosenberg led comic spin-offs into toys, television, and feature films, including the 1.65 billion-dollar film and television franchise Men in Black, based on the Marvel/Malibu comic The Men in Black by Lowell Cunningham. In 1992, Rosenberg brokered a deal in which seven top-selling artists defected from Marvel Comics to form Image Comics. Rosenberg signed the artists to a label deal which made Malibu the publisher of record for the first comics from Image, which gave the upstart creator-run publisher access to the distribution channels. This subsequently led to Malibu breaking all sales records for independent comics. In 1992, Malibu grabbed almost 10% of the American comics market share, temporarily moving ahead of industry giant DC Comics.

Platinum Studios acquired the film and television rights for Jeremiah, which became the first European graphic novel series to be turned into a live action television series on U.S. television (Showtime).

Platinum produces based on two categories: Those from the "Macroverse Bible," a multi-thousand page bible of interrelated comic characters created by Rosenberg, including titles such as Cowboys & Aliens, and properties acquired from other companies or creators such as Dylan Dog and Jeremiah (the latter two having been represented by Rustemagić for publishing rights only, with Platinum acquiring all other rights including film and television). Rustemagić left Platinum Studios in 2000. The company's comic publishing philosophy is for the original publishers or rights holders to continue publishing their comics with Platinum Studios handling all other rights and development. Comics have been published based on Platinum's properties, continuously since inception, whether by Platinum itself or the original rights holders.

In May 1997, soon after forming Platinum Studios, Rosenberg licensed Cowboys & Aliens to  DreamWorks/Universal Studios based on film and comic treatments, storylines, artwork and an iconic one sheet of a cowboy on horseback shooting at an oncoming spaceship.  The one sheet went on to become the graphic novel cover, and the graphic novel has appeared on the New York Times Bestseller List fourteen times for both hardcover and softcover. Platinum Studios Comics published the Cowboys & Aliens graphic novel in various formats between mid-2006 through 2012:

 Full graphic novel online at DrunkDuck.com for free
 Regular edition to comic shops released through Top Cow Productions
 Special editions to large comics-retailers and mail-order houses, with their own logos along with sales incentives and promotions
 Special gold softback and Black hardback editions, many of which were Platinum Studios’ and Rosenberg's gifts to cast and crew of Cowboys & Aliens
 New York Times Best Seller Hardback graphic album, released by HarperCollins
 New York Times Best Seller softback "movie cover" released by HarperCollins
 Barnes & Noble "Nook" Edition

The Cowboys & Aliens film was released theatrically in 2011.

Over the next ten years, Platinum Studios continued to increase the size of its portfolio through licensing, publishing, film, and television contracts with comic book creators.

In 2005, Platinum hired former Time Warner executive Brian Altounian as its chief operating officer.

Originally running for three years from 2006 to 2008, Platinum produced the Comic Book Challenge, an annual, televised competition among aspiring comic book creators. The first Challenge was broadcast on KNSD (the San Diego NBC affiliate) in conjunction with the San Diego Comic-Con, but outgrew NBC affiliate's venue. The following year it was hosted by AT&T.

Platinum Studios posted net losses of $4.3 million in 2006 and $5.1 million in 2007., growing to a revenue of $10.5 million. In September 2006, Platinum Studios purchased the webcomics community site DrunkDuck.com, and in 2008 it acquired the digital media content site WOWIO.

In 2009, Platinum sold WOWIO to Brian Altounian, a Platinum Studios board member and former Platinum COO. In 2010, WOWIO acquired the DrunkDuck community from Platinum Studios as well.

In early 2012, Platinum Studios moved to new offices in West Los Angeles. In 2014, 27 million shares of Platinum were acquired by KCG Holdings.

Film and television production
Platinum has licensed film and television rights to several Hollywood studios. In addition to the finished films Cowboys & Aliens and Dylan Dog: Dead of Night, Platinum is developing a slate of feature films based on Platinum Studio's portfolio, including:
 Atlantis Rising — with producer Mark Canton
 Red Mantis (Mal Chance) — with producer Tony Krantz
 Unique — with producer David Heyman/Walt Disney Pictures
 The Weapon — with TV star David Henrie attached

In addition to Jeremiah, Platinum licensed the television rights to a number of projects, including:
 Indestructible Man —  an as-yet unreleased Platinum Studios Comics title, with Fox 21
 Gunplay — Fox 21

Cowboys & Aliens

Platinum Studios Chairman & CEO Scott Mitchell Rosenberg spearheaded the creation of Cowboys & Aliens in 1997. It was licensed by DreamWorks and Universal Studios in May 1997, based on a one sheet of a cowboy being chased by a spaceship. By the mid-2000s, the film project rights were returned to Platinum. Rosenberg commissioned an Cowboys & Aliens original graphic novel.

Digital publishing
Platinum Studios’ digital publishing works in three areas: web comics publishing, mobile content, and comic news and resources.

Drunk Duck and WOWIO 
In September 2006, Platinum Studios purchased the webcomics community site DrunkDuck.com (created by Dylan Squires) for an undisclosed sum. Drunk Duck was at the time a community of mostly amateur webcomics artists. Platinum Studios signed several option agreements with Drunk Duck community members after the purchase, which caused some discord in the community. Some felt it would help the site's popularity and the community would only get bigger and better; others were concerned Platinum was going to "take over" and claim the rights to people's comics. After the purchase, the site featured a mixture of Platinum Studios-owned professional comics and independently owned amateur comics. Platinum never claimed ownership of any comic that it had not entered into legal documentation with. The Drunk Duck community grew to 95,000 subscribed users in mid-2010.

In June 2008, Platinum Studios announced that it had begun talks to acquire WOWIO, a Los Angeles-based online destination that provides users the ability to share and consume digital media content, such as e-comics and E-books, while providing revenue-generating opportunities for creators and publishers through advertising and merchandising programs. Platinum hoped to make WOWIO a "major cornerstone" of "a global digital publishing distribution initiative."

The companies projected that the acquisition would be concluded early in the third quarter of 2008, but issues related to Wowio's non-payment of quarterly earnings delayed the sale. In June 2009, WOWIO was purchased outright by Brian Altounian (formerly Platinum Studios' COO, and still a Platinum Studios board member); leaving Platinum Studios with no ownership stake or percentage. (Third quarter earnings for the year, calculated on a new formula more favorable to WOWIO, were eventually paid.)

In June 2010, WOWIO acquired DrunkDuck.com from Platinum Studios.

Platinum Studios Comics
Platinum Studios Comics are distributed both online and in print. Online releases start before in-store print release. In addition, some Platinum Studios Comics titles are developed for film, television, and other media such as app games for mobile devices.

Platinum Studios Comics' first print project was the Cowboys & Aliens original graphic novel, created by Scott Mitchell Rosenberg, written by Fred Van Lente and Andrew Foley, and illustrated by Dennis Calero and Luciano Lima.

Titles published

Original graphic novels 
 Alien at Large (2008), created by Bob Keenan and Rich Larson
 The Big Amoeba (2008), created, written and illustrated by Art Baltazar
Cowboys & Aliens (2006), created by Scott Mitchell Rosenberg, written by Fred Van Lente and Andrew Foley, illustrated by Dennis Calero and Luciano Lima
Gunplay (2008), created and written by Jorge Vega, illustrated by Dominic Vivona
 Hot Shot & Mighty Girl (2008), created by Scott Mitchell Rosenberg, written by Fred van Lente, illustrated by Billy Penn
 Love Bytes (2007), created by Scott Mitchell Rosenberg, written by Josh Elder, illustrated by Gigi
 Nightfall (2007), created and written by Scott O. Brown, illustrated by Ferran Xalabarder
 Red Mantis (2007), created, written and illustrated by Martin Pardo and David Morancho — translated from a Spanish comic called Mal Chance: Lola; film rights sold to producer Tony Krantz in 2009
 Super Larry (2008), created by Scott Mitchell Rosenberg, written by Andy Mangels, illustrated by Dan Thompson
 Watchdogs (Feb. 2007), created by Scott Mitchell Rosenberg, written by Fred Van Lente and illustrated by Brian Churilla  —

Limited series/ongoing series 
 The Adventures of Tymm: Alien Circus (3 volumes, 2008–2011), created by Dave Roman and L. Frank Weber
 Atlantis Rising (5 issues, Oct. 2007-Apr. 2008), created by Scott O. Brown and Tim Irwin — film rights sold to producer Mark Canton in 2012
 Big Badz (4 issues, 2008), created by Rob Moran, written by Chuck Dixon, illustrated by Enrique Villagrán
 Blood Nation (4 issues, Feb.–May 2007), created and written by Rob Moran, illustrated by James Devlin
 Consumed (4 issues, July–Oct. 2007)
 Ghosting (5 issues, Aug.-Dec. 2007), created by Scott Mitchell Rosenberg, written by Fred Van Lente, illustrated Charles Carvalho and Carlos Ferreira — co-published with Top Cow Productions
 Hero by Night, created, written and illustrated by D. J. Coffman, colored by Jason Embury
 Limited series (4 issues, Mar.-June 2007)
 Ongoing series (3 issues, Dec. 2007–2008)
 Hero By Night Free Comic Book Day Edition (1 issue, 2008)
 I Was Kidnapped By Lesbian Pirates From Outer Space (6 issues, May 2008 – 2009), created, written and illustrated by Megan Rose Gedris
 Incursion (4 issues, Nov. 2007-Feb. 2008), created by Scott Mitchell Rosenberg, written by Jay Busbee, illustrated by Axel Medellin Machain
 Kiss 4K (6 issues, May 2007-Apr. 2008), written by Ricky Sprague, illustrated by Kevin Crossley and Thomas Ruppert
 Unique (3 issues, Mar.-May 2007), created by Scott Mitchell Rosenberg, written by Dean Motter, illustrated by Dennis Calero — film rights licensed to Walt Disney Pictures in 2009
 The Weapon (4 issues, June–September 2007), created by Scott Mitchell Rosenberg, written by Fred Van Lente, illustrated by Scott Koblish — film rights sold in 2009

Comic Book Challenge 
From 2006 to 2008, Platinum produced the Comic Book Challenge, an annual, televised competition among aspiring comic book creators. The Comic Book Challenge was originally presented by AT&T. Over one million applicants were judged on the quality of the art and writing of their submissions. After hearing all the pitches, judges narrowed the talent pool and turned over the final decision to the voting public. The Challenge was broadcast on KNSD (the San Diego NBC affiliate) in conjunction with the San Diego Comic-Con. Winners received prizes from software to graphics tablets and new PCs, while competing for the first-prize award of publishing their comic with Platinum Studios (as well as other possible media ventures).

The winner of the 2006 Comic Book Challenge was D. J. Coffman's Hero by Night, which was subsequently published as a limited series and an ongoing series by Platinum Studios Comics. I Was Kidnapped By Lesbian Pirates From Outer Space by Megan Rose Gedris made the final round of the 2006 Comic Book Challenge, and was also subsequently published by Platinum Studios Comics and taken offline by Gedris in 2012.

The 2007 judge's panel consisted of Scrubs regular Donald Faison, Shrek producer John H. Williams, and Platinum Studios Chairman Scott Mitchell Rosenberg. The 2007 winner was Jorge Vega's Gunplay, which was published as an original graphic novel by Platinum Studios Comics in 2008. Actor Brandon Routh was a judge for the 2008 Comic Book Challenge which was won by Carlos Weiser's The Armageddon Chronicles. Due to the economic U.S.crisis at the time, Platinum Studios was unable to publish Weiser's book and the event was discontinued after that.

In 2007–2008, Platinum Studios Comics released a large slate of comic book titles and original graphic novels, including KISS 4K, produced in conjunction with the rock band Kiss; and comics by the winners of its Comic Book Challenge talent contest, including Hero by Night by D.J. Coffman.

Notes

References

 MacDonald, Heidi. "Breaking: Work for Hire is Bad!!!", The Beat (June 20, 2007).

External links

 The Comic Book Challenge on Facebook

 
Companies based in Los Angeles
1997 establishments in the United States